This article summarizes the results of polls taken during the presidency of Donald Trump which gather and analyze public opinion on his administration's performance and policies.

Graphical summary

Job approval ratings

Aggregate polls 
Poll numbers verified

2020

2019

2018

2017

Comparative favorability ratings

vs Barack Obama

vs Chuck Schumer

vs Mike Pence

vs Nancy Pelosi

vs Paul Ryan

vs Vladimir Putin

Issue-specific support

Appointment of Neil Gorsuch to Supreme Court 
In February 2017, Donald Trump nominated Neil Gorsuch to the Supreme Court of the United States. Gorsuch was confirmed on April 7, 2017, by a 54–45 vote.

Ban on military service by transgender people 
Donald Trump signed a presidential memorandum banning transgender individuals from serving openly in the U.S. military.

In the following table, the "support" column indicates the percentage of respondents who supported the ban, whereas the "oppose" column indicates the percentage of respondents who were opposed to the ban.

Climate change regulations repeal 
Donald Trump has pledged to repeal certain U.S. government regulations intended to address climate change.

Construction of border wall 
In January 2017, Donald Trump ordered construction of a wall along portions of the Mexico–United States border.

Construction of Keystone Pipeline 
In January 2017, Donald Trump ordered the U.S. Army Corps of Engineers to permit construction of the proposed Keystone XL oil pipeline. Donald Trump wanted to build the final uncompleted portion of the Dakota Access pipeline. The Keystone XL oil pipeline would bring oil from Alberta, Canada to the Nebraska area. It would then connect to an existing pipeline to bring the crude to the Illinois area.

Deportation of illegal immigrants with criminal records 
In an interview following his election, Donald Trump said illegal immigrants with criminal records should be deported.

Government employee staffing cuts 
Donald Trump has proposed a 20-percent cut in parts of the U.S. Government workforce.

Obamacare repeal 
Donald Trump has called for the repeal of the Affordable Care Act ("Obamacare").

Refugee restrictions 
During his presidential campaign, Donald Trump called for the suspension of immigration to the United States from seven "terror prone" countries. In January 2017, he signed an executive order partially implementing that policy and halving annual U.S. refugee intake from 100,000 to 50,000.

Sanctuary city funding 
In January 2017, Donald Trump issued an executive order that would block federal funding to "sanctuary cities".

UN funding 
Donald Trump has said he plans to dramatically reduce United States funding to the United Nations and UN programs.

Withdrawal from the Paris Agreement on climate change 
On June 1, 2017, Donald Trump announced that the United States would withdraw from the Paris Agreement on climate change.

Withdrawal from Trans-Pacific Partnership 
In January 2017, Donald Trump withdrew the United States from the Trans-Pacific Partnership trade pact.

Global polls 
A Gallup poll on 134 countries comparing the approval ratings of US leadership between the years 2016 and 2017 found that only in 29 of them did Trump lead Obama in job approval, with more international respondents disapproving rather than approving of the Trump administration. Overall ratings were reported to be similar to those in the last 2 years of the Bush administration. A Pew Research Center poll of 37 nations conducted in July 2017 found "a median of just 22% has confidence in Trump to do the right thing when it comes to international affairs". This compares to a median of 64% rate of confidence for his predecessor Barack Obama. Trump received a higher rating in only two countries: Russia and Israel. In a 2018 Pew Research poll of 25 nations, the confidence in Trump rose to 27%. In the 2019 poll, the confidence in Trump was at 29%. In the September 2020 poll, the confidence in Trump decreased to 16%.

See also 
 Donald Trump 2020 presidential campaign
 Opinion polling for the 2020 United States presidential election
 United States presidential approval rating

References

External links 
 President Trump: Job Ratings . PollingReport.com
 NBC News/Wall Street Journal poll archive. Wall Street Journal.
 CBS News poll archive. CBS News.
 Fox News poll archive. Fox News.
 Washington Post poll archive. Washington Post.
 Monmouth University poll archive. Monmouth University.
 Quinnipiac University poll archive. Quinnipiac University.
 CNN poll archive. CNN
 Marist poll archive. Marist.
 Kaiser Family Foundation poll archive. Kaiser Family Foundation.
 Donald Trump Presidential Approval. Roper Center for Public Opinion Research.

Opinion polling
Opinion polling in the United States